Fatih Öztürk may refer to:

 Fatih Öztürk (footballer, born 1983), Turkish football goalkeeper
 Fatih Öztürk (footballer, born 1986), Turkish football goalkeeper